Albany Hawke Charlesworth (5 February 1854 – 12 September 1914) was a British Conservative Party politician.

He was the son of John Charlesworth.

Parliamentary career
He unsuccessfully contested Normanton at the 1885 and 1886 general elections.

He was elected at the 1892 general election as the Member of Parliament for Wakefield, but did not stand again in 1895.

References

External links 
 

1854 births
1914 deaths
Conservative Party (UK) MPs for English constituencies
UK MPs 1892–1895